S630 may refer to :
 S630 Aristo, a TOM'S complete car
 Canon S630, a Canon S Series digital camera
 HTC S630, a tri band mobile phone